Felipe Navarro García, better known for his nickname Yale (Córdoba, Spain, 14 June 1930 - Toledo, 23 September 1994) was a Spanish journalist and writer.

Selected works
 Estríctamente confidencial (1960), with Tico Medina.
 El paseíllo (1968).
 Raphael Natalia : la boda del silencio (1972).
 La apertura y la apretura (1975).
 El mundo a la pata coja (1975).
 Los últimos cien días: crónica de una agonía (1975).
 El día que perdí... aquello (1976), with Jesús María Amilibia.
 Las españolas sin sostén (1977).
 Jadeos jacarandosos de las jais y los juláis (1978).
 Diccionario del pasota (1979), with Julen Sordo.
 Yalerías de Yale : (el año del consexo) (1979).
 Un reportero a la pata coja : Yale cuenta su vida (1980).
  Los machistas (1980).
 El divorcio es cosa de tres (1981).
 La bragueta nacional : antología del machismo (1983).

References

1930 births
1994 deaths
People from Córdoba, Spain
Spanish television presenters
Spanish women journalists
Spanish women television presenters
20th-century Spanish writers
20th-century Spanish journalists
20th-century Spanish women